South Carolina Highway 217 (SC 217) is a  state highway in the U.S. state of South Carolina. The highway connects Lodge and Smoaks with rural areas of Colleton and Bamberg counties.

Route description
SC 217 begins at an intersection with SC 64 (Bells Highway) in Lodge, within Colleton County, where the roadway continues as a local road through town. It travels to the east and crosses over Horse Bay on an unnamed bridge. This bridge marks the Bamberg County line. Almost immediately is a crossing of the Little Salkehatchie River. It begins a concurrency with SC 362 (Hunters Chapel Road). Just before the concurrency ends, the two highways re-enter Colleton County. SC 217 splits off to the east-northeast and crosses Hog Branch. In Smoaks, it crosses over Buckhead Creek and has a one-block concurrency with U.S. Route 21 (US 21; Low Country Highway). It heads to the east and crosses over Bear Branch. The highway curves to the northeast before meeting its eastern terminus, an intersection with SC 61 (Augusta Highway), at a point northwest of Canadys. Here, the roadway continues as Salcro Lane.

Major intersections

See also

References

External links

SC 217 South Carolina Hwy Index

217
Transportation in Colleton County, South Carolina
Transportation in Bamberg County, South Carolina